The 2009 Sporting Challenger was a professional tennis tournament played on outdoor red clay courts. It was the ninth edition of the tournament which was part of the Tretorn SERIE+ of the 2009 ATP Challenger Tour. It took place in Turin, Italy between 29 June and 5 July 2009.

Singles entrants

Seeds

 Rankings are as of June 22, 2009.

Other entrants
The following players received wildcards into the singles main draw:
  Andrea Arnaboldi
  Alessio di Mauro
  Thomas Fabbiano
  Matteo Trevisan

The following players received entry from the qualifying draw:
  Sergio Gutiérrez-Ferrol
  Adrián Menéndez-Maceiras
  Cristian Villagrán
  Mariano Zabaleta

The following players received lucky loser spots:
  Joseph Sirianni

Champions

Singles

 Potito Starace def.  Máximo González, 7–6(4), 6–3

Doubles

 Daniele Bracciali /  Potito Starace def.  Santiago Giraldo /  Pere Riba, 6–3, 6–4

References
Official website
ITF search 

Sporting Challenger
Sporting Challenger
Clay court tennis tournaments
Sporting Challenger
Sporting Challenger
Sporting Challenger